Ganoproctus is a genus of parasitic flies in the family Tachinidae. There are at least two described species in Ganoproctus.

Species
These two species belong to the genus Ganoproctus:
 Ganoproctus argentifer Aldrich, 1934
 Ganoproctus longicornis Aldrich, 1934

References

Further reading

 
 
 
 

Tachinidae
Articles created by Qbugbot